Washington's Immortals: The Untold Story of an Elite Regiment Who Changed the Course of the Revolution by Patrick K. O'Donnell chronicles the history of the 1st Maryland Regiment during the American Revolution.

Critical responses

Publishers Weekly notes that O'Donnell "adeptly provides noteworthy thumbnails of both minor and major players, including American and British generals" and that readers interested in the history of the American Revolution will find it "interesting and informative".

The Washington Independent Review of Books describes O'Donnell's book as a "boots on the ground" account, designed for "readers who enjoy well-researched military history".

References

2016 non-fiction books
Atlantic Monthly Press books